Papyrus 54 (in the Gregory-Aland numbering), designated by siglum 𝔓54, is an early copy of the New Testament in Greek. The manuscript palaeographically has been assigned to the 5th century (or 6th century).

It is a papyrus manuscript of the Epistle of James, it contains only fragments of James 2:16-18.22-26; 3:2-4.

The Greek text of this codex is a representative of the Alexandrian text-type. Aland placed it, with some hesitation, in Category III (possibly II).

It is currently housed at the Princeton University Library (P. Princ. 15; earlier Garrett Depots 7742) in Princeton, New Jersey.

See also 
 James 2; James 3
 List of New Testament papyri
 Princeton Papyri

References

Further reading 
 Edward Harris Kase, Papyrus in the Princeton University Collections II (Princeton: 1936), pp. 1–3.

Images 
 Image of 𝔓54 folio 1 recto 
 Image of 𝔓54 folio 1 verso 
 𝔓54 at the Princeton University Library Papyrus

External links 

 Robert B. Waltz. 'NT Manuscripts: Papyri, Papyri 𝔓54
 GA Papyrus 54. Center for the Study of New Testament Manuscripts

New Testament papyri
5th-century biblical manuscripts
Epistle of James papyri